Eugippius (circa 460 – circa 535, Castellum Lucullanum) was a disciple and the biographer of Saint Severinus of Noricum. 

After the latter's death in 482, he took the remains to Naples and founded a monastery on the site of a 1st-century Roman villa, the Castellum Lucullanum (on the site of the later Castel dell'Ovo). 

In 511 Eugippius wrote to Paschasius and asked his venerated and dear friend, who had great literary skill, to write a biography of St. Severinus from the accounts of the saint which he (Eugippius) had put together in crude and inartistic form. Paschasius, however, replied that the acts and miracles of the saint could not be described better than had done by Eugippius.

While at Naples, Eugippius compiled a 1000-page anthology of the works of St. Augustine and 
and was probably involved in the revision of the Vulgate text of the Gospels. He also produced other scholarly works of high quality. There is a monastic rule which is ascribed to Eugippius, but it was early superseded by that of St. Benedict

References

Sources
Eugippius at the University of Evansville

External links

Online text, The Life of St. Severinus (English translation)

6th-century Christian clergy
540s deaths
6th-century Latin writers
Latin letter writers
6th-century Italian writers
Year of birth uncertain